Brazosport Independent School District is a school district based in Clute, Texas (USA) in Greater Houston. The district serves the cities, towns, and villages of Clute, Freeport, Jones Creek, Lake Jackson, Oyster Creek, Quintana, Richwood, and Surfside Beach. In addition it serves the unincorporated area of Turtle Cove.

History
The district opened in 1944.

Prior to 2013 the district had contracts with the police forces of Clute, Freeport, and Lake Jackson to provide police services to the district. In 2013 the district decided to end the contracts and create a district police department. The yearly cost to maintain this department would be $32,000.

Finances
As of the 2010-2011 school year, the appraised valuation of property in the district was $6,406,446,000. The maintenance tax rate was $0.104 and the bond tax rate was $0.020 per $100 of appraised valuation.

Academic achievement
In 2011, the school district was rated "academically acceptable" by the Texas Education Agency.  Forty-nine percent of districts in Texas in 2011 received the same rating. No state accountability ratings will be given to districts in 2012. A school district in Texas can receive one of four possible rankings from the Texas Education Agency: Exemplary (the highest possible ranking), Recognized, Academically Acceptable, and Academically Unacceptable (the lowest possible ranking).

Historical district TEA accountability ratings
2011: Academically Acceptable
2010: Recognized
2009: Academically Acceptable
2008: Academically Acceptable
2007: Academically Acceptable
2006: Academically Acceptable
2005: Academically Acceptable
2004: Academically Acceptable

Schools 

 High schools 
 Brazoswood High School (Clute; Grades 9-12; Mascot: Buccaneers)
 Brazosport High School (Freeport; Grades 9-12; Mascot: Exporters)

 5-8 schools
 Clute Intermediate School (Clute; Grades 5-6 & 7-8; Mascot: Cougars)

 Intermediate Schools (7-8) 
 Freeport Intermediate School (Freeport; Grades 7-8; Mascot: Redskins)
2001-02 National Blue Ribbon School
 Lake Jackson Intermediate School (Lake Jackson; Grades 7-8; Mascot: Panthers)

 Middle Schools (5-6) 
 R. O'Hara Lanier Middle School (Freeport; Grades: 5-6; Mascot: Lions)
 Grady B. Rasco Middle School (Lake Jackson; Grades: 5-6; Mascot: Rockets)

 Elementary Schools 
 Stephen F. Austin Elementary (Jones Creek; Grades: PreK-6) 
 A. P. Beutel Elementary School (Lake Jackson; Grades: K-4) - Its current building was scheduled to open in 2017.
2007 National Blue Ribbon School
 Bess Brannen Elementary School (Lake Jackson; Grades: K-4)
 Freeport Elementary School - The $19.2 million facility opened in 2018. VLK Architects designed the building. The student capacity is 750.
 Madge Griffith Elementary School (Clute; Grades: K-4)
 Elisabeth Ney Elementary School (Lake Jackson; Grades: K-4)
 T. W. Ogg Elementary (Clute; Grades: K-4)
1996-97 National Blue Ribbon School
 Gladys Polk Elementary (Richwood; Grades: K-4)
 O. M. Roberts Elementary (Lake Jackson; Grades: K-4)
 Velasco Elementary School (Freeport; Grades: 2-4) - It was a Kindergarten through grade 4 school until 2017, when it became a grade 2-4 school for all of Freeport. Grades K-1 were moved to O. A. Fleming Elementary, which was scheduled to close in 2018 and be replaced by Freeport Elementary.

 Alternative School 
 Lighthouse Learning Center (Clute; All Grades)

Former schools
 O. A. Fleming Elementary School (Freeport; Grades: K-1) - Fleming was scheduled to close when the new Freeport Elementary School opened in 2018.
 Jane Long Elementary School - It opened in 1952 and closed in August 2017.

Headquarters
The headquarters are physically in Clute, while the district uses a separate Freeport mailing address.

Athletics
The district was formed in the year 1944 when all the existing school districts merged into one.

Many athletics events for the district take place at Hopper Field in Freeport.  Brazosport College serves communities served by the district.

See also 

List of school districts in Texas 
List of high schools in Texas

References

External links 
 
 Brazosport ISD (Archive)

 
School districts in Brazoria County, Texas
1944 establishments in Texas
School districts established in 1944
Freeport, Texas